General Breckenridge may refer to:

James Carson Breckinridge (1877–1942), U.S. Marine Corps lieutenant general
James Breckinridge (1763–1833), U.S. Army brigadier general
John C. Breckinridge (1821–1875), Confederate States Army major general
Joseph Cabell Breckinridge Sr. (1842–1920), U.S. Army brigadier general